The Grieving Tree is a fantasy novel by Don Bassingthwaite, set in the world of Eberron, and based on the Dungeons & Dragons role-playing game. It is the second novel in "The Dragon Below" series. It was published in paperback in March 2006.

Plot summary
The group from the previous novel, The Binding Stone, is joined by former Bonetree hunter Ashi and hobgoblin dirge singer Ekhaas.

Reception
Pat Ferrara of mania.com comments: "Although constrained somewhat in geographic scope, The Grieving Tree'''s plot keeps up its fast pace as major narrative points are brought to light and polished. [...] What I liked most about this novel is the sheer subtlety in characterization: a slew of new characters aren’t introduced but the ones that carried over from The Binding Stone'' show, by their actions, that you've only seen the tip of their personality icebergs.  [...] Smooth action and an unresolved final confrontation ensures that the series won’t lose speed as it approaches its final volume."

References

2006 American novels

Eberron novels